Pyropteron cirgisum is a moth of the family Sesiidae. It is found in scattered localities in Romania Ukraine, Russia, Azerbaijan, Turkey, Turkmenistan and
Kazakhstan.

The larvae feed on Limonium species, including Limonium gmelini and Limonium iconicum.

References

Moths described in 1912
Sesiidae
Moths of Europe